David John Moran (born 22 August 1959) is a British diplomat, who has been ambassador to Uzbekistan, Kazakhstan and Kyrgyzstan, and Switzerland and Liechtenstein.

Early life 
David John Moran was educated at Stoke Brunswick School and Tonbridge School and gained a BA degree in Soviet Studies from Willamette University in Salem, Oregon.

He spent a year working for Oregon State Employment Division, then returned to England for a year to gain a MA degree in International Relations from the University of Sussex.

Career
After another year at Oregon State and a year working as a professional blues pianist he joined the Department of Trade and Industry in 1985 but transferred to the Foreign and Commonwealth Office (FCO) in the same year.
He served at Nairobi, Moscow and Paris and at the FCO before being appointed ambassador to Uzbekistan 2005–07. He was Counsellor in the Human Resources Directorate at the FCO 2007–08, seconded to the Cabinet Office 2008–09, ambassador to Kazakhstan (and non-resident ambassador to Kyrgyzstan) 2009–12, and chargé d'affaires to Georgia in early 2013. He was appointed ambassador to Switzerland and non-resident ambassador to Liechtenstein from December 2013.

In 2013 David Moran was chief consultant to the writers of the BBC TV series Ambassadors.

Personal life

References
MORAN, David John, Who's Who 2014, A & C Black, 2014; online edn, Oxford University Press, Dec 2013
HE Mr David Moran Authorised Biography, Debrett's People of Today
David Moran, gov.uk

External links
 (in Russian), 30 August 2010

1959 births
Living people
People educated at Tonbridge School
Willamette University alumni
Alumni of the University of Sussex
Ambassadors of the United Kingdom to Uzbekistan
Ambassadors of the United Kingdom to Kazakhstan
Ambassadors of the United Kingdom to Kyrgyzstan
Ambassadors of the United Kingdom to Georgia (country)
Ambassadors of the United Kingdom to Switzerland
Ambassadors of the United Kingdom to Liechtenstein